Yenikənd, Nakhchivan may refer to:
 Kiçikoba, formerly Yenikənd, Shakhbuz
 Danyeri, formerly Yenikənd, Sharur